The Combined Development Agency (CDA), originally the Combined Development Trust (CDT), was a defense purchasing authority established in 1944 by the governments of the United States and the United Kingdom.  Its role was to ensure adequate supplies of uranium for the respective countries weapons development programs.

The agency initiated a range of incentives to several countries to encourage exploration and a fast buildup of mineral reserves.  The main countries targeted for the programs were the US, Canada, South Africa, and to a limited extent Australia. The countries tried to monopolize on the resources of the territories they owned or that had hardly any claim. The Belgian Congo was an example of the third world place that was used for its resources.

In Australia, uranium ore from a number of mines was processed at the purpose built Port Pirie Uranium Treatment Complex which operated under contract to the CDA by the Government of South Australia between 1955 and 1962.

History 
General Leslie Groves was a United States General that was put in charge of assembling and maintaining the Manhattan Project. He was a major campaigner for the creation of the CDT because he saw the importance of not only obtaining an adequate amount of uranium to complete the needs of the Manhattan Project, but also to attempt to obtain the uranium so that the Soviet Union would have less access. The entire world's stockpile of uranium was unknown, but a joint effort was a good start to securing access to the most uranium possible. He first created a program, Murray Hill Area Project, that's main goal was to seek locations of uranium ore and thorium ore based on reports from mostly foreign documents. He found that protecting the thorium could prove just as important because it could be converted into uranium. This meant that finding the locations was only half the battle and funneled money into the purchase of the varies mineral rights.

References

Uranium
Agencies of the United States government
1944 establishments in the United States